Farol da Ponta Preta (the Ponta Preta Lighthouse) is a lighthouse in the northwesternmost part of the island of Santiago, Cape Verde. It stands on the headland Ponta Preta, 3 km northwest of the city Tarrafal. The lighthouse was constructed in 1889. Its lantern stands on a white column with a pyramidal base, in front of a small one storey building. The lighthouse was depicted on a Cape Verdean stamp in 2004.

See also
List of lighthouses in Cape Verde
List of buildings and structures in Santiago, Cape Verde

Gallery

References

External links

Ponta Preta
Tarrafal Municipality
Buildings and structures in Santiago, Cape Verde
Transport in Santiago, Cape Verde
Lighthouses completed in 1889
1880s establishments in Cape Verde
Portuguese colonial architecture in Cape Verde